Mokhtar may refer to:

Places
Bordj Badji Mokhtar, desert town in southwestern Algeria
Bordj Badji Mokhtar District, district in Algeria
Cham Mokhtar, village in Iran
Chebaita Mokhtar, town and commune in Algeria
Tam-e Mokhtar, village in Iran
Mokhtar, Kohgiluyeh and Boyer-Ahmad, village in Iran
Mokhtar, Sistan and Baluchestan, village in Iran

Other
Mokhtar (film)
Mokhtar (name)
El Mokhtar, an Arabian horse

See also
 Mukhtar, the head of a village or neighbourhood in many Arab countries as well as in Turkey and Cyprus